The small-billed moa-nalo (Ptaiochen pau), also known as the stumbling moa-nalo, is a species of moa-nalo, one of a group of extinct, flightless, large goose-like ducks, which evolved in the Hawaiian Islands of the North Pacific Ocean. It was described in 1991 from subfossil material collected in September 1982 by Storrs Olson, Helen James and others, from the Auwahi Cave on the southern slopes of Haleakalā, on the island of Maui.

Etymology
The generic name Ptaiochen links the Greek  (“stumble”), with chen (“goose”), alluding to a fancied propensity of the species to fall into holes (thereby becoming part of the fossil record). The specific epithet is from the Hawaiian pau (“finished” or “destroyed”), referring to its extinction.

Description
The species was similar to moa-nalo in the genus Thambetochen in having bony, tooth-like projections on the jaws. However, it differed in other aspects of skull morphology, such as in having a proportionately shorter and deeper rostrum (though nothing like as deep as that of the turtle-jawed moa-nalo of Kauai), a more rounded cranium, and in lacking impressions of salt-glands.

Distribution
Subfossil remains have been found only at altitudes of over 1100 m on Haleakalā, from the Auwahi Cave at 1145 m to the upper Kipahulu Valley at 1860 m, being replaced at lower levels by the larger Maui Nui large-billed moa-nalo.

References

Anatidae
Late Quaternary prehistoric birds
Holocene extinctions
Extinct birds of Hawaii
Biota of Maui
Extinct flightless birds
small-billed moa-nalo
small-billed moa-nalo
small-billed moa-nalo